Tetanops psammophila is a species of picture-winged fly in the genus Tetanops of the family Ulidiidae. It has sometimes been considered a subspecies of T. flavescens.

References

psammophila
Insects described in 1862